National Cycle Network (NCN) Route 64 is a Sustrans National Route that runs from Market Harborough to Lincoln. There are three sections to the route, NCN 63 and NCN 15 form the links between these sections.

History
Between Cotham and Newark the route uses the track bed of the old Newark to Bottesford railway. From Harby to the outskirts of Lincoln the route is a railway path along the trackbed of the Lancashire, Derbyshire and East Coast Railway.

Route

Route 64 starts in Market Harborough at a junction with NCN 6. It heads north through the Leicestershire countryside to Goadby where it is interrupted by NCN Route 63.

It restarts at Owston and Newbold and then passes through the centre of Melton Mowbray. It crosses into Lincolnshire at Woolsthorpe-by-Belvoir and stops shortly after when it meets NCN 15 on the toepath of the Grantham Canal.

Route 64 reappears at another junction with NCN 15 near Thoroton in Nottinghamshire and travels in a north easterly direction picking up the Newark to Cotham Railway Path, a traffic free route as far as Newark Northgate Station. From there the route follows quite roads to Harby where it joins a railway path to Lincoln, passing through the city centre to end at a junction with NCN 1,

Related NCN routes
Route 64 meets the following routes:
 6 at Market Harborough
 63 at Goadby and Owston and Newbold
 15 at Woolsthorpe-by-Belvoir and Thoroton
 647 at Harby
 1 at Lincoln

References

External links

Route 64 on the Sustrans web site
Route 64 on OSM

Cycleways in England
National Cycle Routes